The 2008 Monterey Sports Car Championships presented by Patrón was the eleventh and final round of the 2008 American Le Mans Series season.  It took place at Mazda Raceway Laguna Seca, California on 18 October 2008. It was the first time the event had a sponsor in its name since the 2004 season.

Report

Qualifying
The LMP2 category dominated qualifying, led by the four Acura teams who were able to qualify in the top five positions, led by David Brabham in the Highcroft Racing Acura on pole position.  The Acura squads were broken up only by the #7 Penske Porsche which qualified third.  In LMP1, the #1 Audi led that class but was only ninth overall in the standings.  Among the Corvette teams, the #3 car once again earned pole over its teammate, while GT2 was led by Farnbacher-Loles' Porsche.  Tafel Racing meanwhile led among Ferrari squads in third place within the class.

Qualifying result
Pole position winners in each class are marked in bold.

Race
The final round of the ALMS season was slowed by a total of twelve caution periods over the four-hour race distance, including four within the first hour alone.  This allowed for a variety of pit strategies to come into place as teams chose to make their first pit stops during different caution periods.  The Acura teams led early, but Audi was eventually able to take the overall lead, eventually completing the race first and second, led by the #2 car of Marco Werner and Lucas Luhr.  In LMP2, Acura's also finished first and second, but the #7 Penske Porsche's finish of third was able to secure Porsche the Manufacturers Championship within the class by a single point.

In GT1, the #4 Corvette of Olivier Beretta and Oliver Gavin earned their third win of the season over their teammates, while the #71 Tafel Racing Ferrari secured its fourth victory in GT2 in 2008.  The Risi Competizione Ferrari and Farnbacher-Loles Porsche completed the GT2 podium, while the PTG Panoz had a strong fourth place finish a lap behind.

Race result
Class winners in bold.  Cars failing to complete 70% of winner's distance marked as Not Classified (NC).

References

Monterey
Monterey Sports Car Championships